Bojanowski is a Polish language surname.

People with the surname 

 Edmund Bojanowski (1814–1871), Polish religious figure
 Marion Gunstveit Bojanowski (born 1966), Norwegian politician
 Tina Bojanowski (born 1964), American politician

See also 

 Bokanowski

Surnames
Surnames of Polish origin
Polish-language surnames